Zeynal Khan or Zainal Khan may refer to:
 Zeynal Khan, Kermanshah
 Zeynal Khan, Kurdistan